

Benin

 Nana Nafihou - Mbabane Swallows F.C.
 King Vincent Oyowe - Mbabane Swallows F.C. - 2010

Cameroon

 Eric Bisser - Mbabane Swallows F.C.
 Jocial Tchakounte - Mbabane Swallows F.C.
 Leonardo Bongso - Manzini Sundowns F.C.
 Etienneh Massoye

Congo

 Yannick Ockoly

Democratic Republic of the Congo

 Papy Kabamba Tshishimbi - Mbabane Swallows F.C.
 Sam Mbaya Katala - Mbabane Highlanders F.C.
 Mydo Kingu Yallet - Mbabane Swallows F.C.

Gabon

 Thibault Tchicaya - Mbabane Swallows F.C. - 2009

Ghana

 Kwame Attram - Pigg's Peak Black Swallows F.C. - 2012
 Barnes Mensah - Mbabane Swallows F.C., Manzini Wanderers F.C.
 Bernard Teye - Umbelebele Jomo Cosmos F.C.
 Alex Tagbor - Mbabane Swallows F.C.
 Mohammed Anas - Manzini Wanderers F.C., Mbabane Swallows F.C.
 Ahmed Mohideen - Mbabane Swallows F.C.
 Christian Kassim - Mbabane Swallows F.C. - 2014
 Michael Asamoah - Manzini Wanderers F.C.
 Prince Bonney - Manzini Wanderers F.C. - 2008

Malawi

 Elias Tsabalaka
 Diverson Mlozi - Malanti Chiefs F.C.
 Gomezgani Gondwe
 Kinnah Phiri - Manzini Wanderers F.C. - 1982-84

Mali

 Souleymane Diabate - Umbelebele Jomo Cosmos F.C. 
 Cheick Cissé - Mbabane Highlanders F.C., Mbabane Swallows F.C.

Mozambique

 Eduardo Tamele

Nigeria

 Sunday Ogana 
 Goodwill "Emeka" Ogbonna
 Ifeanyi Ezewudo 
 Daniel Okoye - Mbabane Swallows F.C. - 2014
 Jimoh Moses - Mbabane Swallows F.C., Mbabane Highlanders F.C., Matsapha United FC
 Olayeni Fashina - Mbabane Swallows F.C., Malanti Chiefs F.C.
 Atilola Abdulsalam Tunde - Manzini Sundowns F.C.
 Solomon Oladele - Green Mamba F.C., Red Lions FC
 Stanley Umukoro - Mbabane Swallows F.C.

Senegal

 Mohammed Ndiaye (spelled Ndiyiaye) - Mbabane Highlanders F.C.

South Africa

 Sphamandla Mathenjwa - Mbabane Swallows F.C.
 Thabiso Maharala - Mbabane Swallows F.C. - 2014
 Thabo Tshulungwane - Manzini Wanderers F.C.
 Lucky Mhlathe - Manzini Wanderers F.C. - 2013
 Vusi Madinane - Malanti Chiefs F.C., Royal Leopards F.C.
 Benedict Vilakazi - Malanti Chiefs F.C. - 2013
 Dumisani Kunene (Manzini Wanderers)
 Jabulani Matu (Manzini Sundowns)
 Tebogo Motale (Malanti Chiefs)
 Sihle Ndaba (Malanti Chiefs)
 Myron Shongwe (RSSC United)
 Banele Ndzabandzaba - Matsapha United
 Collen Zimba - Matsapha United
 Ayanda Lumkwane
 Lazola Kunene - Mbabane Swallows F.C.
 Brian Ngwenya - Malanti Chiefs F.C.

Zambia

 Jani Simulambo - Mbabane Highlanders F.C. - 1983-89
 Satali Mulife  - Mbabane Highlanders F.C., Royal Leopards F.C.

Zimbabwe

  Ricky Sibiya 
 Alois Ngwerume - Mbabane Swallows F.C. - 2014-15
 Talent Maposa - Mbabane Swallows F.C. 
 Jim Knowledge - Mbabane Swallows F.C., Red Lions FC - 2014, 2017-
 Kudzanayi 'Vibes' Matanda - Mbabane Swallows F.C.
 Ephraim Mazarura - Mbabane Swallows F.C.
 Stanford Ncube - Mbabane Highlanders F.C., Mbabane Swallows F.C., Manzini Wanderers F.C.
 Size Phiri - Manzini Wanderers F.C.
 Cedric Gulwa - Manzini Wanderers F.C., Mbabane Highlanders F.C.
 Hloniphani Ndebele - Manzini Wanderers F.C., Mbabane Highlanders F.C., RSSC United F.C., Manzini Wanderers F.C., Midas Mbabane City F.C. - 2015, 2015, 2016–17
 Golding Dube
 Zondig Nyaungwa - Mbabane Swallows F.C., Mbabane Highlanders F.C.
 Gilbert Mushangazhike - Manzini Sundowns F.C. - 2010-12
 Pride Zendera

References

Eswatini
Association football player non-biographical articles